The Originals, a one-hour American supernatural drama, was renewed for a fifth and final season by The CW on May 10, 2017. The 2016–17 United States television season debut of The Originals was pushed to midseason, as with the fourth-season premiere. On July 20, 2017, Julie Plec announced via Twitter that the upcoming season would be the series' last. The fifth season consists of 13 episodes and debuted on April 18, 2018. The series finale aired on August 1, 2018.

Cast

Main

Episodes

Ratings

Notes

References 

5